Niklas Hartweg (born 1 March 2000) is a Swiss biathlete.

Career results

World Championships

Podiums

References

2000 births
Living people
Sportspeople from Karlsruhe
Swiss male biathletes
Biathletes at the 2022 Winter Olympics
Olympic biathletes of Switzerland